Ernests Elks-Elksnītis (9 February 1878 – 16 October 1940) was a Latvian singer. His work was part of the music event in the art competition at the 1932 Summer Olympics. He was married to Emīlija Benjamiņa, one of the wealthiest women in Europe.

References

1878 births
1940 deaths
20th-century Latvian male singers
Olympic competitors in art competitions